= Poverty in Bulgaria =

Poverty in Bulgaria is a common phenomenon. As of 2023 the poverty line is an income of €257 or less per month and around 1.5 million Bulgarian citizens (22% of the population) live below the poverty line.

According to Eurostat, as of 2017 23.4% of the Bulgarian population lives at risk of poverty.

Romani people were most at risk for living in poverty.
